Marwan Mohsen Fahmy Tharwat Gameldin Mahmoud Fahmy (born 26 February 1989) is an Egyptian professional footballer who plays as a striker for the Egypt national team.

Mohsen made his debut with Egypt on 3 September 2011 against Sierra Leone in an 2012 Africa Cup of Nations qualifier, where he also scored his first international goal.

Club career

Petrojet
After the impressive performance in the Egyptian Second division side in the first half of the 2009–2010 season, Egyptian Premier League side Petrojet signed him for the rest of the season in the winter transfer window. He made his debut on 13 May 2010 against El Gaish. He earned a spot on Hany Ramzy's Egypt U-23 squad, who were trying to qualify for the 2011 All-Africa Games and the 2012 Summer Olympics, after finishing with a good 2010–11 season with 4 goals. He finished with 2 goals in the unfinished 2011–12 Egyptian Premier League season due to the Port Said Stadium disaster.

In early June 2012, Mohsen's Petrojet coach told the media that “He will move to Europe and the board is studying offers from a number of big clubs,” and continued on to say “Marwan Mohsen is one of the best forwards in Egypt and his place is in the big European leagues.” Interest from Egyptian giants Al Ahly and Zamalek as well as European teams grew exponentially as he succeeded with the Egypt U-23 team leading up to the 2012 Summer Olympics.

After performing extraordinarily well in the 2012 Toulon Tournament and playing well in 2012 Summer Olympics finishing with incredible goal scoring record (21 goals in 31 matches), Mohsen had the interest from Egyptian, Gulf, and European clubs. In the end of August, he demanded a transfer away from the club (preferably outside Egypt) so that he can "solidify his place in Egypt's first team." Unfortunately, Mohsen got Virus C in September which would see him out of action for 2–3 months. He made his return late October in a friendly match against El Gouna after being 2 months out. He played a part in the match scoring a goal in a 3–1 win for Petrojet. On the first of November, Petrojet assistant coach, Samir Sabry, said that Mohsen had officially been cured from Virus C and had also been carrying Hepatitis C ever since the end of the 2012 London Olympics but he had also cured from that as well. He had later played friendly matches in a 3–1 loss to Wadi Degla, Mohsen scoring his club's only goal, and a 3–0 loss to Haras El-Hodood. Later on, in a  friendly match against Egyptian giants Al Ahly, he assisted his side's goal in an entertaining 1–2 loss in front of a large audience. A few weeks later, Petrojet played yet another friendly match with the other Egyptian giants, Ahly rivals Zamalek. Mohsen scored two goals in Petrojet's surprise 2–1 win. After his return from injury, he had scored 4 goals and assisted 2 others in 5 friendlies.

As soon the 2012–13 season finally kicked off, Mohsen was at loggerheads with the coaching staff and the board due to his persistence on leaving the club to help ensure his spot on the national team. Mohsen was benched the first game of the season and was subbed off for the next 2 matches. On 23 February 2013, a loan offer from Russian Premier League side Amkar Perm. Mohsen said that he felt like he was being "persecuted" at the club lately and he had accepted the offer and was waiting for the clubs approval. After travelling to their winter training camp in Bulgaria for a week-long trial before open talks with club and player, Petrojet and Amkar Perm couldn't agree on a suitable fee for the player and Mohsen didn't leave the club. Mohsen finished the 2012–13 campaign with 2 goals in 10 games. However, Amkar Perm had restarted talks with Petrojet for a loan or permanent transfer move after the end of the season.

Gil Vicente
On 10 July 2014, Mohsen and fellow Egyptian Hossam Hassan signed for Gil Vicente on a 3-year contract that would keep him at the club until 2017.

Ismaily
On 15 July 2015, Mohsen signed a 3-year contract with Ismaily Sc as a free transfer after revoking his contract with Gil Vicente. He scored 14 goals and made 10 assists in 32 appearances in the Egyptian Premier League.

Al Ahly
On 21 July 2016, it was officially announced by Al Ahly that Mohsen signed a 5-year contract.

International career
He was part of Egypt's squad for the 2018 FIFA World Cup in Russia., playing in all three matches as the team were eliminated in the group stage.

Career statistics

Club

International

Scores and results list Egypt's goal tally first, score column indicates score after each Mohsen goal.

Honours and achievements

Club
Al Ahly
 Egyptian Premier League: 2016–17, 2017–18, 2018–19, 2019-20
 Egypt Cup: 2016–17, 2019–20
 Egyptian Super Cup: 2017, 2018
 CAF Champions League: 2019–20, 2020-21
 CAF Super Cup: 2021
 FIFA Club World Cup: Third-Place 2020 FIFA Club World Cup
Future
 EFA League Cup: 2022
Egypt
Africa Cup of Nations runner-up: 2017
 Nile Basin Tournament: 2011

References

External links

1989 births
Living people
Egyptian footballers
Egypt youth international footballers
Egypt international footballers
Egyptian expatriate footballers
Egyptian expatriate sportspeople in Portugal
Expatriate footballers in Portugal
2011 CAF U-23 Championship players
Olympic footballers of Egypt
Footballers at the 2012 Summer Olympics
Primeira Liga players
Gil Vicente F.C. players
Petrojet SC players
2017 Africa Cup of Nations players
Footballers from Cairo
Association football forwards
Al Ahly SC players
Ismaily SC players
Egyptian Premier League players
2018 FIFA World Cup players
2019 Africa Cup of Nations players
Future FC (Egypt) players